310 may refer to:

310 (number)
310th (disambiguation)
The year 310 AD
The year 310 BC
Airbus A310, a passenger aircraft.
Area code 310, an area code in Los Angeles, California
USS Batfish (SS-310) submarine
British Rail Class 310 locomotive
Cessna 310 aircraft
Ferrari F310, a Formula One racing car
Lenovo IdeaPad 310, a discontinued brand of notebook computers, same as Lenovo's IdeaPad 510 (2017)
USS S. P. Lee (DD-310) battleship
310 Margarita, an asteroid.
310 Motoring, an automotive customization garage based in Los Angeles
Texas State Highway 310